Tommaso Ammirato (died 1438) was a Roman Catholic prelate who served as Bishop of Lecce (1429–1438).

Biography
Tommaso Ammirato was ordained a priest in the Order of Saint Benedict. On 2 March 1429, he was appointed by Pope Martin V as Bishop of Lecce. He served as Bishop of Lecce until his death in 1438.

See also
Catholic Church in Italy

References

External links and additional sources
 (for Chronology of Bishops) 
 (for Chronology of Bishops) 

15th-century Italian Roman Catholic bishops
1438 deaths
Bishops appointed by Pope Martin V
Benedictine bishops